Chesapeake and Ohio may refer to:
Chesapeake and Ohio Railway
Chesapeake and Ohio Canal